"Never Kill a Boy on the First Date" is the fifth episode of the first season of the television series Buffy the Vampire Slayer. The episode was written by story editors Rob Des Hotel and Dean Batali, and directed by David Semel. The narrative follows Buffy Summers (Sarah Michelle Gellar), as she struggles to find a date and stop the rise of the Anointed One.

Plot
Owen asks Buffy out on a date at The Bronze. Giles has found out about a prophecy from the symbol on a ring they found in the cemetery. He is convinced that the Anointed One will rise that night, and so despite Buffy's protests, they spend hours sitting on graves waiting for a vampire to rise. None does and though Giles is certain that his calculations are correct, he calls their stake-out quits. Buffy rushes to The Bronze, only to see Owen dancing with Cordelia.

At the same time, in a bus on the way to Sunnydale, a man stands up and begins to lecture the other passengers on God's judgment, quoting prophecies. Suddenly, a vampire walks in front of the bus, causing it to crash. Other vampires swarm the wreck, attacking the passengers, including the religious fanatic.

The next morning, Owen asks Buffy out on another date and even gives her a pocket-watch so that she does not miss it this time. When evening comes, Giles shows up at Buffy's house, waving a newspaper that shows five people died when the bus crashed, among them the suspected murderer Andrew Borba, the man who was quoting prophecies. Buffy insists on going to the Bronze so Giles decides to check the Sunnydale funeral home himself. Unfortunately, there are vampires present to get the Anointed One, and they trap Giles in a room. Xander and Willow have followed him, though, and run back to The Bronze to get Buffy.

There, first Cordelia, then Angel tries to come in between Buffy and Owen. Finally, Xander and Willow managed to get her to come to the funeral home by pretending to be a couple that wants to do something daring on a double date. When Buffy figures out what has happened, she tries to ditch Owen, but unfortunately, he tags along. Even worse, he is present in the funeral home when Borba rises as a vampire. In the fight, Owen is knocked unconscious. Buffy kills Borba by sliding him into the lit furnace.

The next morning, Owen is excited about the thrill of the action, but Buffy turns him down, realizing that there is no way that she can have a relationship with him without putting him in danger. Giles tries to comfort her by telling her what a burden it was for him as a ten-year-old to find out his destiny was to be a watcher when he wanted a more fun career. Both agree that at least the Master will be unhappy, too, because the Anointed One was destroyed.

But in his underground lair, the Master is overjoyed as he welcomes the real Anointed One—not Borba after all, but a young boy who was on the bus with him.

Reception
"Never Kill a Boy on the First Date" first aired on The WB on March 31, 1997. It earned a Nielsen rating of 2.8 on its original airing. It was the 104th most watched show out of all 115 primetime shows of its time; fifth out of the eleven shows from The WB.

Noel Murray of The A.V. Club liked that the episode explored a new side of Buffy, but felt that the four previous episodes had not set up Buffy as a "person with normal teenage tastes and desires". He still found "a lot to like" in the episode. A BBC review stated that some "very amusing scenes compensate for the absence of an involving plot". The review noted that the plot took a while to get started and the direction of the funeral home sequences made it fall short of its potential. DVD Talk's Philip Duncan identified "Never Kill a Boy on the First Date" the "weakest" episode of those relating to the Master plotline in the season.

References

External links
 

Buffy the Vampire Slayer (season 1) episodes
1997 American television episodes

it:Episodi di Buffy l'ammazzavampiri (prima stagione)#Il primo appuntamento